Zamora Fútbol Club is a Venezuelan football club in Barinas.

History
Zamora Fútbol Club was founded in 2002. After being in the Second Division for several years the club was promoted to the First Division after finishing as runners-up in the Second Division in the 2005–06 season. Zamora FC have been champions 4 times (2013, 2014, 2016, 2018).

Honours
Primera División
Champions: 2012–13, 2013–14, 2015, 2016, 2018
Copa Venezuela
Winners: 2019

Performance in CONMEBOL competitions
Copa Libertadores: 3 appearances
2012: Group Stage
2014: Group Stage
2015: Group Stage
2017: Group Stage

Copa Sudamericana: 4 appearances
2007: Preliminary Round
2009: First Round
2015: First Round
2016: Second Round

Stadium
The club plays their home matches at Estadio Agustín Tovar, which has a maximum capacity of 30,000 people.

Players

Managers
 José de Jesús Vera (2010–11)
 Oscar Gil (June 9, 2011 – April 11, 2012)
 Julio Quintero (April 12, 2012 – June 30, 2012)
 Noel Sanvicente (July 1, 2012–14)
 Juvencio Betancourt (2014)
 Francesco Stifano (2015–2017)

External links
  

Association football clubs established in 2002
Football clubs in Venezuela
Barinas (state)
2002 establishments in Venezuela